Nogod (stylized as NoGoD) is a Japanese visual kei heavy metal band formed in 2005 by vocalist Dancho. Originally named , the band has been using simply Nogod since signing to the major label King Records in 2010.

History

2005–2009: Formation and rise
The band was formed in early 2005 by vocalist Dancho, under the name Shinko Shukyo Gakudan NoGoD. They held their debut performance on October 19, at Akasaka L@n, with a lineup consisting of Dancho on vocals, Aki and Kyrie on guitar, Karin on bass, and K on drums. On November 12, the band released their first demo . They spent the rest of 2005 and the beginning of 2006 performing with other bands in Tokyo.

In 2007, guitarist Aki left and was replaced by Shinno.

In April 2008, the band released their first studio album, which reached No. 6 on the Oricon Indies chart.

In February 2009, the band released their second studio album, .

2010–present: Going major
In November 2009, vocalist Dancho announced that the band would be making their major debut. On June 9, 2010, Nogod released their first major single, on King Records. The song was used as the ending theme for Chūkyō TV's Futtonda.

On August 4, 2010, Nogod released their first major album, in Japan and Europe. The band kicked off a one-man tour to promote their album in Taiwan; they followed up the show with other performances throughout Tokyo.

In January 2011, Nogod began hosting their own radio show on Tokyo Bay FM. The program is titled Nogod Bless You!!! and airs every Saturday at 12:00AM.

Nogod covered Siam Shade's song "1/3 no Junjou na Kanjou" for the compilation Crush! -90's V-Rock Best Hit Cover Songs-. The album was released on January 26, 2011 and features current visual kei bands covering songs from bands that were important to the '90s visual kei movement.

In January 2018, Nogod bassist Karin announced that he would leave the band after 13 years. His final performance with the band was on April 6 of that year in Tokyo at Shinjuku ReNY.

In September 2021, it was announced that guitarist Kyrie would be leaving the band after 16 years. His final performance with Nogod was at Nakano Sun Plaza Hall on February 22, 2022. Saber Tiger bassist hibiki officially joined Nogod in August 2022.

Musical Style
Nogod's music ranges from heavy metal to slow ballads. Songs such as  have been praised for the technical skill that the band has exhibited.

Members
 – vocals (2005–present)
K – drums (2005–present)
Shinno – guitar (2007–present)
hibiki – bass (2022–present)

Former members
 – guitar (left July 2005)
Kana – bass (left October 2005)
 – guitar (2005–2007)
 – bass, screams (2005–2018)
Kyrie – guitar, backing vocals (2005–2022)

Discography

Studio albums
  (2008.04.09)
  (2009.02.25)
  (2010.08.04)
  (2011.08.03)
 V (2013.02.06)
 Make A New World (2014.09.17)
 Renovate (2016.03.30)
 Proof (2017.08.20)

Mini albums
  (2006.12.06)
  (2009.09.23)
  (2019.04.10)

Compilation albums
 Indies Best Selection 2005-2009 (2010.03.03)
 Voyage ~ 10th Anniversary Best Album (2015.04.08)

Singles
  (2005.11.12)
  (2006.04.09)
  (2006.07.12)
  (2006.08.30)
 "Atria" (2007.05.09)
  (2007.08.08)
  (2007.09.26)
  (2007.09.26)
  (2008.02.16)
  (2008.07.13)
  (2008.10.08)
  (2008.11.05)
 "Mr.Heaven" (2009.07.25)
  (2010.06.09)
 "Raise a Flag" (2011.04.06)
  (2011.07.06)
 "Love?" (2012.02.19)
 "Stand Up!" (2012.10.10)
  (2013.07.24)
  (2013.09.18)
 "Helix" (2020.01.08, sold only at concerts)
 "I.A.N" (2022.11.25, sold only at concerts)

DVDs
  (2006.06.20)
  (2022.08.24)

Other
 "No God" on Loop of Life 6 (2006.06.28)
 "Kimi ni Okuru Bukiyou de Migatte na Uta" on  (2006.09.15)
 "Guren" on Shock Edge 2006 (2006.10.10)
 Cover of Siam Shade's "1/3 no Junjou na Kanjou" on Crush! -90's V-Rock Best Hit Cover Songs- (2010.01.26)

References

External links
Official Site 
 Official website inactive
 King Records page
 Gan-Shin page
 CLJ Records page
 Oricon profile

Visual kei musical groups
Japanese heavy metal musical groups
Musical groups established in 2005
Musical quintets
King Records (Japan) artists
Musical groups from Tokyo